R.T. Rama  is an Indian actress in the Kannada film industry. Some of the notable films of R.T. Rama as an actress include Gejje Pooje (1969), Gowri (1963), Sharapanjara (1971), and Jedara Bale (1968).

Awards
 Rajyotsava Award (2014) 
 Kempegowda Award (2015)

Career
Rama has been part of more than 50 films and many soaps/serials in Kannada. She is a graduate of the National School of Drama, New Delhi, India and currently, a member of the faculty at Nagathihalli School of Cinema. She was a professor in Bangalore university.

Selected filmography

 Mana Mecchida Madadi (1963)
 Mahasathi Anasuya (1965)
 Nanna Kartavya (1965)...Basavi
 Miss Leelavathi (1965)
 Sri Kanyaka Parameshwari Kathe (1966)
 Sri Krishna Rukmini Satyabhama (1971)
 Naa Mechida Huduga (1972)

TV serials and shows
Comedy Khiladigalu Championship (2018) - Team mentor
Kannadathi (2020–present) - Mangalamma

See also

List of people from Karnataka
Cinema of Karnataka
List of Indian film actresses
Cinema of India

References

External links
 

1949 births
Living people
Actresses in Kannada cinema
Actresses in Tamil cinema
Kannada people
Actresses from Karnataka
Actresses from Bangalore
Indian film actresses
21st-century Indian actresses
Actresses in Kannada television